This is a list of the main career statistics of Belgian professional tennis player Elise Mertens since her professional debut in 2010. So far, Mertens has won seven WTA singles titles and 16 doubles titles, including three Grand Slam doubles titles, as well as one doubles title at WTA 125 tournaments and 11 singles titles and 13 doubles titles on the ITF Circuit. She reached a career-high WTA singles ranking of No. 12, while in doubles, she is the world No. 1.

Career achievements

Mertens made her WTA Tour debut at the 2015 Copa Colsanitas, in the doubles event. The following year, she started with title at the Auckland Open, partnering with An-Sophie Mestach. In June of the same year, she made her singles debut at the WTA Tour at the Rosmalen Championships as a qualifier. At the 2016 Wimbledon, she made her Grand Slam main-draw debut in doubles, and then at the 2016 US Open, she done it also in singles. Mertens started into the 2017 season, winning her first title in singles at the Hobart International, defeating Monica Niculescu. In April 2017, she reached another WTA Tour final, but this time finished runner-up at the Istanbul Cup, losing to the final to Elina Svitolina. At the 2017 French Open, she recorded her first Grand Slam match win, defeating Daria Gavrilova in the first round. In October 2017, she recorded her first top-10 win over world No. 10, Dominika Cibulková, in the first round of the Premier Mandatory-level China Open.

The 2018 season was of big improvements for Mertens. She had strong start, defending her title at the Hobart International, after she defeated Mihaela Buzărnescu. There she also won title in doubles. She followed this with her first and so far only Grand Slam semifinal in singles at the Australian Open. There, she also defeated world No. 4, Elina Svitolina, in order to reach semifinal. In April, she continued with good performances, winning titles in both singles and doubles at the Ladies Open Lugano. Soon after that, she won Morocco Open, after defeating Ajla Tomljanović in the final. During the grass season, Mertens had success in doubles. First, she won Rosmalen Championships with Demi Schuurs and then reached final of the Premier-level Birmingham Classic, also with Schuurs. During the USA hardcourt Tour, she stand out more in singles. First, she reached semifinal of the Premier-level Silicon Valley Classic and then quarterfinals at the Premier 5-levels Canadian Open and Cincinnati Open. In Cincinnati she also made top 10 win over world No. 3, Sloane Stephens, and reached final in doubles. Then, at the Asian hardcourt swing, she won title at the Premier 5-level Wuhan Open and final of the Premier Mandatory-level China Open, both in doubles with Schuurs. At the end of the year, she played at the WTA Elite Trophy in singles and at the WTA Finals in doubles, losing in the round-robin phase, respectively.

Mertens continued to progress in 2019. In February, she won her first Premier singles title at the Qatar Open by defeated world No. 3, Simona Halep, in the final. On her path to the final, she also made two more top-10 wins over world No. 8, Kiki Bertens, and No. 6, Angelique Kerber. Soon after that, she won Sunshine Doubles (Indian Wells and Miami Open), both in doubles alongside Aryna Sabalenka. She then continued with good performances in doubles, reaching semifinal of the French Open and quarterfinal of Wimbledon. At the US Open, she done well in both events, reaching quarterfinal in singles and title in doubles alongside Sabalenka. At the 2020 US Open, she reached quarterfinals for the second year in-a-row, and also came to the same stage in doubles. Mertens started 2021 season with the title at the WTA 500-level Gippsland Trophy in Melbourne, right before Australian Open. There she also defeated world No. 5 Elina Svitolina. At the Australian Open, she won her second Grand Slam doubles title, again with Aryna Sabalenka. Mertens ascended to world No. 1 in doubles, on 10 May 2021.

Performance timelines

Only main-draw results in WTA Tour, Grand Slam tournaments, Fed Cup/Billie Jean King Cup and Olympic Games are included in win–loss records.

Singles
Current through the 2023 Indian Wells Open.

Doubles
Current through the 2023 Australian OPen.

Significant finals

Grand Slam finals

Doubles: 4 (3 titles, 1 runner-up)

WTA Finals

Doubles: 2 (1 title, 1 runner-up)

WTA 1000 finals

Doubles: 8 (4 titles, 4 runner-ups)

WTA career finals
Mertens made her WTA Tour debut in 2015 at the Copa Colsanitas. In 2016, she reached and won her first WTA Tour final at the Auckland Open in doubles event. In 2017, she reached her first WTA singles final at the Hobart International, where she succeeded to win the title. In 2019, she continued to progress and win her first Grand Slam title at the 2019 US Open, alongside Aryna Sabalenka, where they defeated Ashleigh Barty and Victoria Azarenka. At the 2021 Australian Open, they won another Grand Slam title, this time defeating Barbora Krejčíková and Kateřina Siniaková. On the WTA Tour, Mertens has won seven singles and 11 doubles titles in total.

Singles: 11 (7 titles, 4 runner-ups)

Doubles: 27 (16 titles, 11 runner-ups)

WTA Challenger finals
Mertens made her debut at the WTA Challenger Tour at the Taipei Open in November 2015, where she also reached final in doubles. She lost in that final alongside Marina Melnikova, but year later she won her first doubles title at the Open de Limoges, partnering with Mandy Minella.

Doubles: 2 (1 title, 1 runner-up)

ITF Circuit finals
Mertens made her ITF Women's Circuit debut in 2010. Since then, she reached 13 singles finals, winning 11 of them. In doubles, she done even better, with 13 titles out of the 23 finals that she reached. In Singles, she won two $50/60K titles, while in doubles she won four $50/60K titles and played two $70K/80K finals.

Singles: 13 (11 titles, 2 runner–ups)

Doubles: 23 (13 titles, 10 runner–ups)

WTA Tour career earnings 
Current after the 2022 Wimbledon
{|cellpadding=3 cellspacing=0 border=1 style=border:#aaa;solid:1px;border-collapse:collapse;text-align:center;
|-style=background:#eee;font-weight:bold
|width="90"|Year
|width="100"|Grand Slam <br/ >titles|width="100"|WTA <br/ >titles
|width="100"|Total <br/ >titles
|width="120"|Earnings ($)
|width="100"|Money list rank
|-
|2015
|0
|0
|0
|style=text-align:right|61,272
|219
|-
|2016
|0
|0
|0
|style=text-align:right|140,327
|157
|-
|2017
|0
|1
|1
|style=text-align:right|549,215
|64
|-
|2018
|0
|3
|3
|style=text-align:right|2,364,006
|17
|-
|2019
|0
|1
|1
|style=text-align:right|2,796,400
|12
|-
|2020
|0
|0
|0
|style=text-align:right|1,123,558
|style=background:#eee8aa|10
|-
|2021
|0
|1
|1
|style=text-align:right|2,098,133
|style=background:#eee8aa|9
|-
|2022
|0
|1
|1
| align="right" |1,344,235
|13
|-style=font-weight:bold
|Career
|0
|7
|7
|style=text-align:right|10,522,571
|54
|}

Career Grand Slam statistics
 Career Grand Slam seedings 
The tournaments won by Mertens are in boldface, and advanced into finals by Mertens are in italics.

 Singles 

 Doubles 

 Best Grand Slam results details 
Grand Slam winners are in boldface', and runner–ups are in italics.

Record against other players
Record against top 10 playersMertens's record against players who have been ranked in the top 10. Active players are in boldface.''

Top 10 wins

Double bagel matches (6–0, 6–0)

Longest winning streaks

13 match win streak (2018)

Notes

References

External links
 
 
 Elise Mertens's CoreTennis Profile

Mertens, Elise